Ksenija Sidorova (born on 18 May 1988 in Riga) is a Latvian accordionist.

In 2016, she signed an exclusive recording contract with Deutsche Grammophon. Her first album on the label, Carmen, is a recreation of Georges Bizet's Carmen for accordion that incorporates Latin, Asian, European and North American musical styles.

References 

Latvian classical musicians
Deutsche Grammophon artists
1988 births
Living people
Latvian accordionists